Hansjörg Göritz (English: Hansjoerg Goeritz; born 5 June 1959) is a German-American architect, professor, author and designer associated with pure and minimalist architecture that emphasizes place, space, light and material. For his early works he was awarded one of the most prestigious architecture awards in Germany in 1996, the Development Award Baukunst to the Kunstpreis Berlin by the Academy of Arts, Berlin. In 2013 he was recognized as an Affiliated Fellow to the American Academy in Rome.

Biography 
Goeritz was born in Hannover, West Germany and grew up in the vernacular context of Lower Saxony as the son of a mason. After his Abitur he apprenticed to a mason with honors as Best of the Guild. At the same time he enrolled for courses at an evening school for master masons, after which he apprenticed in architecture mainly as an autodidact, in conjunction with studies at Hildesheim University of Applied Arts and Sciences, and at the London Architectural Association School of Architecture. After Grand Tours d'Orients in the Mediterranean, to Cistercian monasteries, to picturesque gardens in England, and travels in Scandinavia he practices with his Studio in Hannover since 1986, and Berlin since 2007.

He designed Liechtenstein's state forum and parliament buildings, the first in its history, for which he was awarded the international Brick Award 2010 that was previously awarded to Pritzker laureate Peter Zumthor in 2008. His Expo 2000 train station design is materialized with custom made Florentine cobalt blue glass blocks and blue pigmented concrete to match the color of the German state railway corporate design on the Expo-line, connecting the airport to the Expo fairgrounds, in Hannover, Germany. The project became an exhibit at the 6th Biennale di Architettura, Venice 1996.

He has taught architecture as a visiting professor at Hildesheim University of Applied Sciences and Arts in 1995 – 1997, as a tenured professor at Dortmund University of Applied Sciences and Arts in 1999 – 2001, and is a professor at the University of Tennessee, College of Architecture and Design in Knoxville, Tennessee, since 2007. In an international arena he lectures widely and was a visiting critic at prestigious institutions including the Accademia di Architettura Mendrisio and Yale, is a visiting adjunct faculty at Auburn University, and has taught at the 2018 UT Finland Architecture Summer Institute at Aalto University Helsinki. By appointment he is affiliated to Bund Deutscher Architekten BDA (German Association of Architects) since 1993 and Deutscher Werkbund DWB (German Association of Fine Works) since 2000, and is an International Associate with the American Institute of Architects AIA since 2007. By invitation he joined The International Journal of The Arts in Society of Common Ground Publishers, Illinois, USA as an associate editor in 2010, the Wessex Institute of Technology, UK, in 2011 as an international scientific advisory committee member, and the board of Knoxville's James White's Fort Association in 2020.

Among other notable recognitions he was a state nominee for the German Villa Massimo Rome Prize 1988, for the German international architects and architecture critics award, the Erich-Schelling-Award 1998, and was awarded the Deubau-Award for Young German Architects 1994, the BDA Award Lower Saxony 1994, and the German Brick Award 1994.

Family
Göritz is married to Gisela Göritz. The couple has two children, Cornelius, a filmmaker and specialist for vintage Porsche cars, and Camilla, an actress

Selected projects

 2015   Museum of the 20th Century in the Cultural Forum, Berlin, Germany
 2015   The Gardens of Bamiyan, Cultural Center, UNESCO, Bamiyan, Afghanistan
 2013   Karosta Ghost Town Challenge Cultural Center, Liepaja, Republic of Latvia
 2007   Neue Rheinuferpromenade Novartis Campus Basel [New Rhine Embankment Promenade Novartis Campus Basel]
 2008 – 2009   Grand Garden (Knoxville Botanical Gardens and Arboretum), Knoxville, Tennessee, USA
 2007  Concrete Origami, (New Rhine River Embankment Promenade), Basel, Switzerland
 2001 – 2008   Supreme House (National Forum and Assembly), Vaduz, Principality of Liechtenstein
 1991 – 2007  Medallion, (Baroque Timber Market Square), Wolfenbüttel, Germany
 1997   Volumes of Glass Blocks (Metro Rail Station EXPO 2000), Hannover Nordstadt, Germany
 1996   Long Dormitorium (Suburban Condominiums), Bemerode, Germany
 1993   Hall within Stone Block (Suburban H Residence), Ahlem, Germany 
 1993   Stone Wall (Klimmt Head Offices + Showroom), Hildesheim, Germany
 1992   Stone House inside Timber House (Rural K Residence), Kirchhorst, Germany
 1990   House on Columns within a House (Suburban H Residence), Pattensen, Germany
 1989   House with Glass Block Lantern (M Dentist Office), Hannover, Germany

Awards and recognitions
 2020   Faculty Development Award, Lewerentz Indifference, University of Tennessee
 2019   AIA National Award for Innovation in Technology, University of Tennessee Technology Curriculum, co-laureate
 2017   Alumni Outstanding Teacher Award, Nominee, University of Tennessee
 2015   Faculty Development Leave, awarded sabbatical 
 2014   Faculty Development Award, Beginning Design, University of Tennessee
 2013   American Academy in Rome Affiliated Fellowship, University of Tennessee, for Rome research proposal 'Intra Murus', including studies on Louis I. Kahn's 1953 AAR residence
 2012   Prometheus Leadership Award, University of Tennessee, Center for Educational Leadership, for contributions to improve education through an interdisciplinary approach to leadership, learning and service
 2010   Scholar of the Week, University of Tennessee, for merits of the International Brick Award 2010
 2010   Brick Award 2010, International Prime Award for Liechtenstein State Forum and National Assembly
 2009   German Architecture Museum DAM Prize for Architecture in Germany selected Liechtenstein National Assembly
 2008   Bundesstiftung Baukultur Potsdam [German Foundation for Built Culture] selects public buildings for trust's collection
 2007   Postage Stamp, Series 'Contemporary Architecture', First Edition 19 November 2007, New Parliament, Principality of Liechtenstein
 2006   Hyde Chair of Excellence, shortlisted, University of Nebraska at Lincoln, USA
 2000   Aga Khan Trust for Culture, Geneva Switzerland, selects writings and buildings for trust's collection
 1998.  Erich-Schelling-Award 1998, Trustees Nominee, International Award for Architects and Architecture Critics
 1996   Kunstpreis Berlin 1996, Development Award Baukunst, Akademie der Künste Berlin, Germany
 1994   National Deubau-Preis Junge Architekten  1994 for 'Hall within Stone Block', 'Stone House inside Timber House', and 'Stone Wall'
 1994   National Brick Award 1994 for 'Hall within Stone Block', 'Stone House inside Timber House', and 'Stone Wall'
 1994   BDA Award Lower Saxony 1994, German Association of Architects, award for H Residence
 1994   BDA Award Lower Saxony 1994, German Association of Architects, acknowledgment for Klimmt Head Offices
 1988   Villa Massimo, German Rome Prize, Section Architecture, State Nominee, Lower Saxony Ministry of Education and Culture

Selected publications
 2019   A+U 588, Japan Architecture and Urbanism, September 2019, Silent Master Builder, author                                                                          
 2017   A+U 564, Japan Architecture and Urbanism, September 2017, Bernt Nyberg, co-guest-editor
 2017   A+U 564, Japan Architecture and Urbanism, September 2017, Rediscovering and Contextualizing Nyberg, author
 2016   Three Scandinavian Sisters, Book Inclusion, S:t Petri 50 Ar, Klippan, Sweden, author
 2016   Lewerentz’s Lessons, Book Inclusion, S:t Petri 50 Ar: Kontext, Fragmenter, och Influenser, Klippan, Sweden
 2015   Nyberg’s Sublime Sculptures, Catalogue Essay to the exhibition Endangered Architecture, Lund, Sweden, author
 2014   Architecture Forum Hong Kong, Commentaries on Chinese Avantgarde Architecture, author
 2013   db 7/13, Zur Architekturkritik [On Architecture Criticism], author
 2012   der architect 6/12 ex libris, Grundlegend – Ungers Thematisierung und Rossis Selbsbiographie, author
 2011   the Atlantic Magazine, Feature on the Principality of Liechtenstein Parliament 
 2010   Phaidon Atlas of 21st Century World Architecture (Phaidon Press, 2010)
 2010   brick '10 (Hansjörg Göritz Brick Award 2010, Callwey 2010) 
 2009   German Architecture Annual 2009 – 2010 (Prestel, 2009) 
 2009   Lighting India 1 (Calculated Light – On Essentials for Rebirth of Architectural Space, Hansjörg Göritz 2009)
 2009   DBZ 2/09 (Die Leichtigkeit des Steins?, Hansjörg Göritz 2009)
 2009/2010   WIT/common ground (Vast Vicinity or Dense Garden Carpets – Learning from Essential Settlings and Dwellings, Hansjörg Göritz 2009/2010)
 2008   hochparterre 4/08 (Der zweite Leitbau Liechtensteins, Benedikt Loderer)
 2008   Neue Zürcher Zeitung 10 March 2008 (Stadt im Werden, Roman Hollenstein)
 2007   Alpenmagazin (Interview Hansjörg Göritz, Wie im Sandkasten, Urs Fitze)
 2007   Dortmunder Architekturheft No 20 (Hohes Haus – der Gesetzgebung Obdach geben, Hansjörg Göritz 2007) 
 2006   Baukultur 6.06 (Das Phaenomen Louis I Kahn, Hansjörg Göritz 2006)
 2006   Baukultur 5.06 (Wohnen und Siedeln – Erkundungen des Essentiellen, Hansjörg Göritz 2006)
 2005   Liechtensteiner Vaterland 14 September 2005 (Interview Hansjörg Göritz, Wenigen ist ein solches Privileg gegeben, Susha Maier)
 2001   Neue Zürcher Zeitung 6 April 2001 (Das Parlament als Urhütte, Beat Aeberhard)
 2000   Berliner Zeitung Feuilleton 7 April 2000 (Auf dem Weg zur Expo, Klaus-Dieter Weiss)
 2000   Arche (Archen bauen – Mittler und Übergangsräume zwischen Hermetik und Hermeneutik, Hansjörg Göritz, Editor 2000)
 1998   Baukultur 5.98 (Riss und Raum – Plädoyer für eine neue Konvention des Bauens als Raumkunst, Hansjörg Göritz 1998)
 1998   Jahrbuch Licht und Architektur 1998 (Das Beispiel, Kalkuliertes Licht – Wiedergeburt architektonischen Raumes, Hansjörg Göritz 1998) 
 1998   Young German Architects 1 – Hansjörg Göritz (Birkhäuser, 1998) 
 1997   Berliner Zeitung Feuilleton 5 November 1997 (Ein Bahnhof ohne Stadt im Bauch, Klaus-Dieter Weiss)
 1996   AIT 1–2 96 (Ungesetzte Steine – oder: Die Praxis kultureller Donquichotterie, Hansjörg Göritz 1996)
 1995   AIT 7–8 95 (Hommage – Heinz Bienefeld 1926 – 1995, Hansjörg Göritz 1995) ISSN 0173-8046
 1995   Architektur in Niedersachsen 1970–1995 (Junius, 1995) 
 1994   Centrum Jahrbuch Architektur und Stadt (Genauigkeit und Mythos – Steinhäuser von Hansjörg Göritz, Vieweg 1994) 
 1994   Neue Zürcher Zeitung 1 July 1994 (Geist und Handwerk, Clemens Klemmer)
 1994   Frankfurter Allgemeine Feuilleton 22 March 1994 (Lernen von Vitruvius – Erinnerung an vergessene Ursprünge: Die preisgekrönte Architektur von Hansjörg Göritz, Gert Kähler)

See also
 AA School London – Notable former students

References

External links

 Hansjörg Göritz – official website
 
 Promotional Award Baukunst, Kunstpreis Berlin – Academy of Arts Berlin
 Hansjörg Göritz – University of Tennessee
 Hansjörg Göritz – Dortmund 1
 Hansjörg Göritz – Dortmund 2

1959 births
20th-century German architects
Architects from Hanover
Living people
German male writers